The 2018 Team Speedway Junior World Championship was the 14th FIM Team Under-21 World Championship season. The final took place on 18 August, 2018 at the Outrup Stadium in Outrup, Denmark.

Poland won their 11th Team Under-21 World Championship, and their fifth in succession. The Poles accumulated 46 points, with Bartosz Smektała top scoring for them with 13 points. Hosts Denmark finished second with 42 points, with Great Britain in third on 29.

Semi-finals

Final 

  Outrup
 18 August 2018

Scores

See also 
 2018 Speedway of Nations
 2018 Individual Speedway Junior World Championship

References 

2018
World Team Junior